Sayyid Davood Mir-Bagheri is an Iranian director, writer and film producer. His notable works are Shaheed-e-Kufa, Mokhtarnameh and Salman the Persian.

Filmography

Television 
 Masoomiyat Az Dast Rafte
 Imam Ali
 Mokhtarnameh
 Salman the Persian

Home Video 
 Shahgoosh
 Gold Tooth

Cinema 
 The Snowman
 The Sorceress
 Traveler of Rey

References

External links 

 

Iranian film directors
Iranian directors
1958 births
Living people